St. Nicholas Hospital is a private hospital located in Lagos Island in Lagos, Nigeria. It was founded in 1968 by Moses Majekodunmi. The hospital is in a building of the same name located at 57 Campbell Street near Catholic Mission Street. It has other facilities at different locations in Nigeria. Their other locations are: St. Nicholas Hospital, Maryland, St. Nicholas Clinics, Lekki Free Trade Zone, St. Nicholas Clinics, 7b Etim Inyang Street, Victoria Island.

Description 
The hospital's 14-storey mixed-use high-rise building (St. Nicholas house) was designed by FMA Architects Ltd. The building's users includes several companies' offices with modern amenities and multilevel parking. The building is adjacent to King's College Lagos, Holy Cross Cathedral, Lagos and Lagos City Hall. The hospital spans five floors of the building with an outpatient clinic and emergency services on the ground floor.

Milestones
St. Nicholas hospital has become a leading organ transplant centre in Nigeria, performing the first renal transplantation treatment, the first kidney transplant in Nigeria and the first paediatric kidney transplant in West Africa.

Services

Nephrology
Medical and Emergency
Intensive Care
Preventive Health Screen
Colonoscopy and Endoscopy
General Medicine
Nursing care
Cardiology
Paediatrics
Antenatal Care
Diagnostic Imaging
Clinical Laboratory
Surgery
Radiology
Family Medicine
Physiotherapy
Obstetrics and Gynaecology
Oncology
Nutrition and dietetics
Dermatology
Dialysis
Pharmacy
Health Assessment

Fire incident
On 3 February 2014, 9:00 a.m. WST – At approximately 5:55 p.m. on Sunday, 2 February 2014, there was a fire on the 9th floor of the building. Urgent action was taken to extinguish the fire, the cause of which was believed to be an electrical problem.

See also

List of hospitals in Lagos

References

External links
  St. Nicholas Hospital's Official Website

1968 establishments in Nigeria
Hospitals established in 1968
Lagos Island
Private hospitals in Lagos
Office buildings in Lagos